Onobox is a 1992 comprehensive 6-disc collection of Yoko Ono's work from 1968 to 1985. The discs are grouped by era and theme. Disc one centers around the albums Fly and Yoko Ono/Plastic Ono Band, while Disc two features nearly the entirety of Approximately Infinite Universe in a different running order and most of the tracks remixed exclusively for this boxed set. Disc three features the entire Feeling the Space project, which was originally conceived and recorded as a double album before being edited down, while disc six is the previously unreleased 1974 album A Story, which was later reissued separately with an expanded track listing, along with the rest of Ono's back catalogue.

Discs four and five center on her relationship with her late husband and musician John Lennon, with "Kiss, Kiss, Kiss" highlighting songs from their duet albums Double Fantasy and Milk and Honey, while "No, No, No" focuses on the albums Yoko released in the aftermath of the murder of John Lennon.

Onobox was complemented by an accompanying one-disc "greatest hits" release, entitled Walking on Thin Ice. While the Rykodisc press release for Onobox declared the collection "not as bad as you might think", it also urged the public to "smash your preconceptions". Which, for the most part, they did, finding the box gave "Yoko Ono the avant- garde heroine her due".

Track listing
All songs written by Yoko Ono except "No Bed for Beatle John" written by John Lennon/Yoko Ono.

Many songs were edited or remixed for this compilation. These mixes and edits have not been officially released elsewhere.

Previously unreleased material

Onobox includes 20 previously unreleased songs. Some of these songs have appeared on other Yoko releases.

 The first 9 tracks from Disc 6 were all included on the A Story album when it was released in 1997.
 "The Path" was included on the 2017 Reissue of Fly.
 "Warrior Woman", "Potbelly Rocker", "It's Been Very Hard", "Mildred, Mildred" and "Left Turn's the Right Turn" were all included on the 2017 Reissue of Feeling the Space.
 "There's No Goodbye" was re-recorded for the album Take Me to the Land of Hell.

In addition to this, "Head Play" (a medley of the songs "You", "Airmale" and "Fly" specially made for this boxset) was included on the 2017 Reissue of Fly.

Ultracase edition
A limited edition version of Onobox was released called the "Ultracase" Edition. This version included the entire 6-disc box set along with the accompanying 1-disc Walking on Thin Ice compilation and a sculpture by Yoko called A Key to Open the Universe with a signature by Yoko, all packaged in a protective carrying case. This edition was released limited to 350 copies, and a small number of boxes without Onobox but all other items were also made for those who already owned the Onobox set.

Release history

References

Yoko Ono albums
1992 compilation albums
Rykodisc compilation albums
Albums produced by Yoko Ono